Laureen Rebeha Zouaï (born on March 5, 1995), better known as Lolo Zouaï, is a French-born American R&B and pop musician. Born to a French mother and an Algerian father in Paris, France, Zouaï moved to San Francisco, California when she was three months old. She graduated from Lowell High school in 2013. She released her debut album, High Highs to Low Lows, in 2019. The album was given a 7.5 out of 10 rating by Pitchfork. Zouaï was featured as "one to watch" by The Guardian in April 2019. She co-wrote "Still Down" from H.E.R.'s self-titled album, which won a Grammy Award for Best R&B Album.

After completing the opening slot on the North American leg of Dua Lipa's Future Nostalgia Tour, Lolo released her sophomore album PLAYGIRL in October 2022. She announced The PLAYGIRL World Tour slated for 2023. In November 2022, Zouaï was included in the Forbes 30 under 30 2023 list for musicians. In an interview at the 2023 Billboard Women In Music, Lolo revealed that her contract with RCA Records has ended and she is currently an independent artist under her own record label, Keep it on the Lolo and Because Music.

Discography

Albums 
 High Highs to Low Lows (2019)
 PLAYGIRL (2022)

EPs 
 Ocean Beach (2019)
 Beautiful Lies (2020)

Singles 
 "So Real" (2016)
 "IDR" (2016)
 "High Highs to Low Lows" (2017)
 "Blue" (2018)
 "Brooklyn Love" (2018)
 "Desert Rose" (2018)
 "For the Crowd" (2018)
 "Challenge" (2018)
 "Ride" (2019)
 "Moi" (2019)
 "It's My Fault" (2020)
 "Alone with You" (2020)
 "Beautiful Lies (Cold)" (2020)
 "Galipette" (2021)
 "Scooter" (2021)
 "Give Me a Kiss" (2022)
 "Blur" (2022)
 "pl4yg1rl" (2022)
 "Crazy Sexy Dream Girl" (2022)

Tours 
Headlining

 Lolo Zouaï Live in Concert (2018)
 High Highs to Low Lows Tour (2019)
 The PLAYGIRL World Tour (2023)

Supporting

 Alina Baraz – Alina Baraz: The Tour (2018)
 Dua Lipa – Future Nostalgia Tour (2022)
The Marias – The Marias: Cinema (2022)

References

1995 births
American contemporary R&B singers
French people of Algerian descent
American people of Algerian descent
Living people
21st-century American singers
21st-century American women singers
Singers from Paris
Singers from San Francisco
French emigrants to the United States
American people of French descent